André Bauchant (April 24, 1873 – August 12, 1958) was a French 'naïve' painter. He is known mostly as a painter of flowers and of landscape compositions with figures which were often informed by mythology and classical history.

He was born in Château-Renault, Indre-et-Loire. The son of a gardener, he originally entered his father's trade, and progressed to operating a nursery. In 1914, he was called to serve in World War I. During the military service his drawing skills were noticed and he was trained as a mapmaker. After demobilization in 1919 he found his nurseries destroyed. He and his wife relocated to Auzouer-en-Touraine, where he found work on local farms. Inspired by the rural environment, at the age of 45, he dedicated himself to a career as a painter.

Many of his early works depict biblical or mythological themes. His first exhibit was in 1921 at the Salon d'Automne, where he showed a large Ulysses and the Sirens and eight other paintings. Le Corbusier and Amédée Ozenfant wrote an article about him for the journal L'Esprit Nouveau in 1922, and Le Corbusier became an important collector of his work. In 1927 Bauchant was commissioned by Diaghilev to design sets for Stravinsky's Apollon Musagète.

Subsequently, Bauchant's most frequent subjects were floral still lifes and landscapes with figures. In 1937 his paintings were included in the exhibition Maîtres Populaires de la Réalité, which traveled to Paris, Zurich, and London. In 1938–1939, a version of the same exhibition was presented at eight US museums, beginning with the Museum of Modern Art in New York. In 1949, a retrospective exhibition of 215 of his works was mounted by the Galerie Charpentier in Paris.

According to the art historian Nadine Pouillon, "Bauchant's treatment of figures, frozen in attitudes indicating a certain awkwardness and as if enshrined in foliage, manifest a poetic and mysterious quality sometimes reminiscent of medieval paintings. This association was further emphasized by his use of unglazed colours in the manner of quattrocento frescoes and by a colour sense similar to that of Giotto."

Notes

References
 
 Brettell, Richard R., Paul Hayes Tucker, and Natalie Henderson Lee (2009). Nineteenth- and Twentieth-century Paintings. New York: The Metropolitan Museum of Art. .
 Pouillon, Nadine. "Bauchant, André." Grove Art Online. Oxford Art Online. Oxford University Press. Web.

External links
Tate collection
MoMA collection
Artnet

1873 births
1958 deaths
Naïve painters
19th-century French painters
French male painters
20th-century French painters
20th-century French male artists
19th-century French male artists